Mat Croker (born 11 September 1999) is an Australian professional rugby league footballer who plays as a  for the Newcastle Knights in the NRL.

Background
Croker was born in Nabiac, New South Wales, Australia. He is of Chilean descent.

He played his junior rugby league for Taree City Bulls and Taree Panthers, before being signed by the Newcastle Knights.

Playing career

Early years
Croker rose through the ranks for the Newcastle Knights, playing with their Harold Matthews Cup team in 2015, the S. G. Ball Cup side from 2016 to 2017, captaining the side in the latter year, and finally the under-20s side from 2017 to 2019. During those years, he also played for the New South Wales under-16s and under-20s teams. In November 2017, he re-signed with the Knights on a 3-year contract until the end of 2020. In 2020, he joined the Knights' NRL squad as one of their 6 allocated development players, as he graduated to the Canterbury Cup NSW team.

2021
In 2021, Croker started the year without a contract but played with Newcastle's NSW Cup squad as captain of the side. Ahead of round 13 of the 2021 NRL season, Croker signed an NRL contract with the Newcastle Knights after they lost three forwards from the last round in Tyson Frizell (injury), David Klemmer (suspension) and Daniel Saifiti (State of Origin selection). This allowed Croker to make his NRL debut for the Newcastle club against the Parramatta Eels which ended in a 40-4 defeat.

Personal life
Croker is currently the lead host and face of the 257 Collective podcast with fellow NRL players Kalyn Ponga and Connor Watson.

References

External links
Newcastle Knights profile

1999 births
Living people
Australian people of Chilean descent
Sportspeople of Chilean descent
Australian rugby league players
Newcastle Knights players
Rugby league players from New South Wales
Rugby league props